An askari was a local soldier serving in the armies of the European colonial powers in Africa.

Askari (Arabic: عسكري, 'soldier' or 'military') may also refer to:

People
Hasan al-Askari (c. 846 – 874), an Imam of Twelver Shia Islam
Abu Hilal al-Askari (died 1005), an Islamic scholar
Askari Mirza, or simply Askari (1516 – 1557/1558), a son of Babur Mirza, founder of the Mughal dynasty
Ali Askari (1936–1978), Kurdish politician
Askari Mian Irani (1940–2004), a Pakistani painter
Askari Mohammadian (born 1963), an Iranian wrestler
Bahman Askari (born 1991), an Iranian karateka
Hasan Askari (writer) (1919-1978), Pakistani scholar and linguist 
Hasan Askari Rizvi, Pakistani political scientist and military analyst
Hossein Askari (born 1975), Iranian racing cyclist
Hossein Askari (economist), Iranian economist
Jafar al-Askari (1885–1936), Iraqi prime minister 
Khwaja Hassan Askari (1921–1984), the last Nawab of Dacca
Majid Askari (born 1991), an Iranian weightlifter
Malika Askari, Indian actress
Murtada Sharif 'Askari (1914–2007), known as Allamah 'Askari, a Shiite scholar
Rashid Askari (born 1965), Bengali-English writer and academic
Rouhollah Askari (born 1982), Iranian hurdler
Sami al-Askari, Iraqi politician 
Sana Askari, Pakistani model and actress
Süleyman Askerî, (1884–1915), Ottoman Army military officer
Yousef Al-Askari (born 1994), a Kuwaiti swimmer
Zainab Al Askari (born 1974), Bahraini actress
Askari X, Ricky Murdock, an American hip-hop artist
Wazir Khan (Sirhind), (died 1710, real name Mirza Askari), a governor of Sirhind

Fictional characters
Scar (The Lion King), known as "Askari" according to Ford Riley

Places
Askari, Iran (disambiguation), a number of places in Iran
Askari Amusement Park, Karachi, Pakistan
Askari Monument, Dar es Salaam, Tanzania
Al-Askari Shrine, or Al-Askari Mosque, Samarra, Iraq
Al-Askari mosque bombing (disambiguation)

Other uses
Askari Aviation, a Pakistani airline 
Askari Bank, a Pakistan commercial and retail bank
Askari Group of Companies, or Army Welfare Trust, a Pakistani Army conglomerate company
Operation Askari, a 1983 military operation in Angola
USS Askari (ARL-30), a World War II U.S. Navy ship

See also

Askar (disambiguation)
Askariyeh (disambiguation)
Ascari Cars, a British automobile manufacturer